"He Gets That from Me" is a song written by Phillip White and Steven Dale Jones, and recorded by American country music artist Reba McEntire.  It was released in August 2004 as the third single from her album Room to Breathe.  The song reached #7 on the Billboard Hot Country Singles & Tracks chart in February 2005.

Chart performance

Year-end charts

References

2004 singles
Reba McEntire songs
Songs written by Steven Dale Jones
Song recordings produced by Norro Wilson
Song recordings produced by Buddy Cannon
MCA Nashville Records singles
Music videos directed by Trey Fanjoy
2003 songs